
Grójec County is a unit of territorial administration and local government (powiat) in Masovian Voivodeship, east-central Poland. It came into being on January 1, 1999, as a result of the Polish local government reforms passed in 1998.

As of 2019 its total population is 98,334, out of which the population of Grójec is 16,745, that of Warka is 11,948, that of Nowe Miasto nad Pilicą is 3,755, that of Mogielnica is 2,253, and the rural population is 63,633.

Neighbouring counties
Grójec County is bordered by Grodzisk Mazowiecki County and Piaseczno County to the north, Otwock County to the north-east, Garwolin County and Kozienice County to the east, Białobrzegi County and Przysucha County to the south, Tomaszów Mazowiecki County and Rawa County to the west, and Żyrardów County to the north-west.

Administrative division
The county is subdivided into 10 gminas (four urban-rural and six rural). These are listed in the following table, in descending order of population.

References

 
Land counties of Masovian Voivodeship